Deborah Woodson is a singer and author. She was born in Cordele, Georgia, US. She started her career singing gospel music in her grandfather’s Baptist church at the age of two. She graduated with honors (Cum Laude) from North Carolina Central University with a degree in music.

Work

Woodson started her professional musical career in New York City, where she expressed her own personal style of soul, jazz, and gospel music in various Broadway show productions. Deborah is a versatile performer who has played stages all over the US, from the Aladdin Casino in Las Vegas to the infamous Ford's Theater in Washington, D.C., where she sang before the President of the United States of America.

Deborah moved to Germany in 1997. She was an immediate success, performing frequently on the RTL Saturday Night Live Show. Deborah was vocal coach in the nationally televised Deutschland sucht den Superstar (The German Idol). and served on the jury for European Gospel Awards 2004, 2005 and 2006.

She has traveled the world conducting gospel workshops and performing with her gospel group, The Gospel Soulmates.

Deborah played Motormouth Maybelle in the original German version of the musical Hairspray 2009 in the Musical Dome in Cologne, Germany,  and she is the voice of the dragon  in the musical Shrek 2014. She was the Church lady in the King of Love, a musical about the life of civil rights leader Martin Luther King.  She has written and produced two musicals, Sing Hallelujah and Sister Soul Divas.

Work as an author
Deborah Woodson has written two books with her mother, Dr. Juanita J. Johnson.

Book 1: "God Has Chosen You": A Thirty Day Journey Toward Finding and Implementing Your God Chosen Life - Paperback (Jan. 6, 2007)
Book 2: "Gospel Jubilations" ("Wendepunkte" in German) is a book containing thirty-two (32) Christian testimonies, told by people who have experienced the power of God to change their lives-Paperback (Sept. 9, 2009)

Woodson and Dr. Juanita J. Johnson have also written and published numerous songs and musical concerts. In 2009 they completed a musical entitled Gospel Jubilations, which incorporates the principles of the book God Has Chosen You! and utilizes the true-to-life testimonies found in the book Gospel Jubilations.

Discography

 Salvation 2002
 Gospel Jubilations 2009
 Gospel Christmas 2010

Awards

2009: The book "Gospel Jubilations" ("Wendepunkte" in German)'' was listed in the top 40 of Best Books at the German Book convention in Leipzig, German.

References 
 Gospel Christmas Cd  
 Gospel Jubilations Cd  
 "Gospel Jubilations Book"  
 "Wendepunkte" (16 entscheidende Begegnungen) Deborah Woodson and Juanita J. Johnson   
 Brunnen Publishing 
 "God has chosen you!" (A THIRTY DAY JOURNEY TOWARDS FINDING AND IMPLEMENTING YOUR GOD CHOSEN LIFE) Dr. Juanita J. Johnson and Deborah Woodson-Heck. 2006  ISBN D-9748584-5-5
 Salvation Cd Produced by Fun and Music LC 00033 
 North Carolina Central University Archives
 Hairspray 
 Shrek 
www.woodson.de 
 www.facebook.com/deborahwoodson

Living people
American women singers
North Carolina Central University alumni
Year of birth missing (living people)
21st-century American women